Rhipicera is a genus of beetle belonging to the family Rhipiceridae. The larvae are parasitoids of cicadas.

Species 
All five species of the genus Rhipicera are closely related based on their morphological characters.

Rhipicera attenuata ; Western Australia
Rhipicera carinata ; Western Australia
Rhipicera femorata ; Eastern coast from southern Queensland to South Australia and Tasmania
Rhipicera mystacina ; Queensland
Rhipicera reichei ; Queensland

Gallery

References

External links
 

Beetles of Australia
Polyphaga genera